Carabus glabratus is a species of beetle. It is a Boreo-arctic Montane species widespread in Central Europe and Northern Europe north to the Arctic Circle.

External links
Carabus glabratus at Ground Beetles of Ireland

glabratus
Beetles of Europe
Beetles described in 1790
Articles containing video clips
Insects of the Arctic